Some of My Best Jokes Are Friends is the third studio album by George Clinton. It was released in 1985 by Capitol Records. Though it wasn't as successful as Computer Games, Clinton's first solo album, Some of My Best Jokes Are Friends received favorable reviews among critics. While many former P-Funk musicians are featured on the album, it also features collaborations with more contemporary performers such as Doug Wimbish, Steve Washington, and keyboardist Thomas Dolby.

Some of My Best Jokes Are Friends employs various producers from the P-Funk musical collective, including Clinton, Garry Shider, Washington, Bootsy Collins, Junie Morrison, Clinton's son Tracy Lewis, Wimbish, and Dolby.

Track listing
"Double Oh-Oh" (George Clinton, Garry Shider, St. Song) (released as a single-Capitol B-5473 and as a 12" single-Capitol V-8642) - 5:47
"Bullet Proof" (George Clinton, St. Song) (released as a single-Capitol 5504 and as a 12" single-Capitol V-8653) - 6:19
"Pleasures Of Exhaustion (Do It Till I Drop)" (George Clinton, Steve Washington) - 7:05
"Bodyguard" (George Clinton, Bootsy Collins, Walter Morrison) - 3:49
"Bangladesh" (Tracey Lewis) - 4:55
"Thrashin'" (Rodney Curtis, Shawn Clinton, Garry Shider) - 5:38
"Some of My Best Jokes Are Friends" (George Clinton, Doug Wimbish, Bernard Alexander) - 6:01

Personnel

Lead vocals: George Clinton and Thomas Dolby
Almost lead vocals: Garry Shider, Sandra Feva, Joe Harris
Background vocals: Pat Lewis, Sandra Feva, Jimmy G, Tracey Lewis, Andre Foxxe, Garry Shider, Linda Shider, Robert Johnson, Michael Payne, Jerome Rogers, Lige Curry, Patti Curry, DeWayne McKnight, Steve Washington, Sheila Washington, Debbie Wright, Faye Cavendar, Shirley Hayden, Mallia Franklin, Gary Cooper, Bootsy Collins, Louie Kababbie, Rod Simpson, Ron Ford, Jeanette McGruder, Jim Wright, Shawn Clinton, Daryl Clinton, James Wilkerson, Beverly Wilson, 
Guitars: DeWayne "Blackbyrd" McKnight, Michael Hampton, Andre Foxxe, Tony Hooks, Bootsy Collins, Eddie Hazel, Garry Shider, Bernard Alexander, Steve Washington, Stew Simon
Real bass: Rodney Curtis, Doug Wimbish, Steve Washington
Electric bass chips: Bootsy Collins, Doug Wimbish, David Spradley, Steve Washington
Keyboards: Thomas Dolby, Junie Morrison, Bootsy Collins, Tracey Lewis, Doug Wimbush, Eric White, Steve Washington, David Spradley
Fairlight and assorted keyboard chips: Thomas Dolby
Real drums as in traps: Dennis Chambers, Bootsy Collins
Electric drum chips: Bootsy Collins, Tracey Lewis, Bernard Alexander, David Spradley
Sequential circuits and linn drums: Steve Washington
Percussion: Muruga Booker, Bootsy Collins, Larry Fratangelo
Strings: Bob Basso, David Everheart, Manny Capote, Lorraine Basso, Bogden Chrusey, Gary Wedder, Stu McDonald
Horns: Maceo Parker, Greg Boyer, Greg Thomas, Benny Cowan, Eric White, Ken Faulk, Ed Calle
Flute solo on "Pleasures Of Exhaustion (Do It Till I Drop)": Mike Fleming
Saxophone solo on "Bangladesh": Ed Calle
 Air Raid Siren guitar synth on "Bulletproof":Stew Simon

Notes

References

External links
 Some of My Best Jokes Are Friends at Discogs
 Some of My Best Jokes Are Friends at The Motherpage
 Album Review: column 1, paragraph 7 at The Daily Collegian

George Clinton (funk musician) albums
1985 albums
Albums produced by Thomas Dolby
Capitol Records albums
Albums with cover art by Pedro Bell